Youssef Aït Bennasser (born 7 July 1996) is a professional footballer who plays as a midfielder for Adanaspor. Born in France, he represents Morocco at international level.

Club career

Nancy
Aït Bennasser is a youth exponent from AS Nancy. He made his Ligue 2 debut on 3 August 2015 against Tours FC. He scored the first senior goal of his career on 28 November 2015 as Nancy beat Le Havre 3–1 in a home of Stade Marcel Picot victory.

Monaco and loans
On 31 January 2019, the last day of the 2018–19 winter transfer window, Aït Bennasser departed Monaco on loan for the third time, joining the club's league rivals AS Saint-Étienne on loan until the end of the season.

Adanaspor
The Moroccan midfielder signed a two-year contract with Turkish club Adanaspor, which is in the TFF First League.

International career
Despite being born and raised in France, Aït Bennasser joined the Royal Moroccan Football Federation. He played two matches for the Morocco national under-17 football team in 2013.

He made his debut for the senior Morocco national team in a friendly 0–0 tie with Albania. In May 2018 he was named in Morocco's 23-man squad for the 2018 World Cup in Russia.

Career statistics

Club

International

References

1996 births
People from Toul
Sportspeople from Meurthe-et-Moselle
Footballers from Grand Est
Citizens of Morocco through descent
French sportspeople of Moroccan descent
Living people
Association football midfielders
Moroccan footballers
Morocco international footballers
French footballers
AS Nancy Lorraine players
AS Monaco FC players
Stade Malherbe Caen players
AS Saint-Étienne players
FC Girondins de Bordeaux players
Adanaspor footballers
Ligue 1 players
Ligue 2 players
TFF First League players
2017 Africa Cup of Nations players
2018 FIFA World Cup players
2019 Africa Cup of Nations players
French expatriate footballers
Moroccan expatriate footballers
Expatriate footballers in Turkey
French expatriate sportspeople in Turkey
Moroccan expatriate sportspeople in Turkey